Neptis angusta, or Condamin's sailer, is a butterfly in the family Nymphalidae. It is found in Ghana (the Volta Region), the Democratic Republic of the Congo (Sankuru, Tshuapa, Tshopo and Ituri), western Uganda and north-western Tanzania.

References

Butterflies described in 1966
angusta